Klemens Mielczarek (17 October 1920 – 2 January 2006) was a Polish film actor. He appeared in more than 20 films between 1935 and 1991.

Selected filmography
 Wacuś (1935)
 Niedorajda (1937)

References

External links

1920 births
2006 deaths
Polish male film actors
Actors from Lublin